Trustmark Park is the home of the Mississippi Braves, the Southern League Double-A affiliate of the Atlanta Braves and is located in Pearl, Mississippi, USA. The ballpark, which opened April 18, 2005, has capacity for 8,480 fans. There are 5,500 chair-back seats in the reserved seating areas. The grass berm beyond the outfield walls has room for an additional 2,000 general admission customers.  On August 13, 2006, a record crowd of 7,652 saw the M-Braves defeat the Huntsville Stars 4–2. The largest crowd to ever see a game at the park was the 2016 Governor's Cup in which 8,542 fans watched the Mississippi State Bulldogs defeat the Ole Miss Rebels, 2–0.

The ballpark derives its name from the sale of naming rights to Trustmark Bank headquartered in Jackson.

Features
Trustmark Park features a 360° concourse that allows fans to circle the playing field without missing a pitch. The ballpark is in a recessed bowl with seating starting at the main level and proceeding downward. All support facilities face outward onto the concourse, thus spectators can leave their seats and not be separated from the game action.

Red bricks and exposed steel trusses reflect the feel of a historic ballpark, with modern-day conveniences.

22 luxury suites that seat between 16 and 64 fans are climate controlled and equipped with flat screen televisions, refrigerators, ice makers, serving counters and sliding glass doors that open up to private seating areas. Suites are available for yearly and nightly rentals. The ballpark also includes a picnic pavilion located in the left field corner of the stadium and two party decks located on the suite level. The picnic pavilion can be rented on a nightly basis for groups of 100 to 350+ people. The first and third base party decks are also available on a nightly basis for groups of 30 to 50 fans. Many businesses host employee appreciation functions throughout the year.

There are 150 closed-circuit video monitors positioned around the ballpark televising the game. A merchandise store and a kids play area is located at the main gate. The team store is open Monday through Friday from 9 am to 5 pm year-round.

Events
In 2011, the venue hosted the Conference USA baseball tournament, won by Rice.

It hosted the 2012 tournament, as well, which was won by UAB.

Each year Trustmark Park plays host to the Governor's Cup, a neutral-site meeting between Mississippi State and Ole Miss. While both teams play each other on campus as part of Southeastern Conference play, this game is a non-conference matchup between the two bitter rivals that regularly draws capacity crowds. The tradition of a one-off game in the Jackson area has existed since 1980, when it was known as the Mayor's Trophy and played in Jackson proper: it was moved to Pearl when Trustmark Park opened in 2005 and thus renamed. As of 2020, the Bulldogs lead the overall neutral-site series 22–18, with a 9–4 lead in games played in Pearl.

References

External links
 Mississippi Braves

Minor league baseball venues
Baseball venues in Mississippi
Buildings and structures in Rankin County, Mississippi
2005 establishments in Mississippi
Sports venues completed in 2005
Populous (company) buildings
Southern League (1964–present) ballparks